The SweetSexySavage World Tour was the second official concert tour by American R&B singer Kehlani, in support of their debut studio album SweetSexySavage (2017). The tour began on February 21, 2017, in Montreal, Quebec, at Club Soda, and concluded on November 18, 2017, in Mexico City, Mexico, at the Corona Capital festival.

Background
On December 2, 2016, Kehlani revealed a list of some cities that would be included on their 2017 tour, and on December 8, 2016, theyannounced a more complete list of tour dates across Europe and North America. Kehlani also revealed that Ella Mai, Jahkoy, and Noodles (Micah Mahinay), would be opening for the tour. In addition, Kehlani's godson, cousin, Marteen Estevez acommpanied as an opener for select dates on the tour. General sale tickets for all of the dates announced on December 2, 2016, went on sale on December 14, 2016. More dates were gradually announced as well as various dates for music festivals across the United States. On March 14, 2017, Kehlani announced via social media that they would be having hernia surgery, forcing them to postpone the remaining European dates, although they were ultimately cancelled. On March 16, 2017, several dates in Australia and New Zealand were announced. Various dates in North America were also rescheduled.

Set list
This set list is representative of the show on February 21, 2017, in Montreal, Quebec. It does not represent the set list from all of the shows.

"Keep On"
"Distraction"
"Do U Dirty" 
"Get Away"
"The Way"
"Too Much"
"Get Like"
"Gangsta"
"I Wanna Be"
"Everything Is Yours"
"Not Used to It"
"Hold Me by the Heart"
"Advice"
"Piece of Mind"
"Escape"
"Undercover"
"In My Feelings"
"Personal"
"Crzy"
"Thank You"

Shows

Cancelled shows

Notes
A  The shows on April 16 & 23, 2017 in Indio, United States, were part of the 2017 Coachella Valley Music and Arts Festival.
B  The show on June 2, 2017, in New York City, United States, was part of the 2017 Governors Ball Music Festival.
C  The show on July 23, 2017, in Los Angeles, United States, was part of the 2017 FYF Fest.
D  The shows on August 19 & 20, 2017 in Japan were part of the 2017 Summer Sonic Festival.
E  The show on October 27, 2017, in New Orleans, United States is part of the 2017 Voodoo Experience.
F  The show on October 29, 2017, in Los Angeles, United States, is part of the 2017 Camp Flog Gnaw Carnival.
G  The show on November 3, 2017, in Chicago, United States, is part of the 2017 30 Days in Chicago concerts presented by Red Bull Sound Select.
H  The show on November 12, 2017, in McDade, United States, is part of the 2017 Sound on Sound Fest
I  The show on November 18, 2017, in Mexico City, Mexico, is part of the 2017 Corona Capital festival.

References

2017 concert tours
Kehlani